BETASOM (an Italian language acronym of Bordeaux Sommergibile or Sommergibili) was a submarine base established at Bordeaux, France by the Italian Regia Marina Italiana during World War II. From this base, Italian submarines participated in the Battle of the Atlantic from 1940 to 1943 as part of the Axis anti-shipping campaign against the Allies.

Establishment
Axis naval co-operation started after the signing of the Pact of Steel in June 1939 with meetings in Friedrichshafen, Germany, and an agreement to  exchange technical information. After the Italian entry into the war and the Fall of France, the Italian Royal Navy established a submarine base at Bordeaux, which was within the German occupation zone. The Italians were allocated a sector of the Atlantic south of Lisbon to patrol. The base was opened in August 1940, and in 1941 the captured French passenger ship  was used as a depot ship before being returned to the Vichy French Government in June 1942. Admiral Angelo Parona commanded the submarines at BETASOM under the operational control of Konteradmiral (Rear Admiral) Karl Dönitz. Dönitz was the "Commander of the Submarines" (Befehlshaber der U-Boote) for the German Kriegsmarine. About 1,600 men were based at BETASOM.  A postal system was operated, using a distinctive stamp cancellation and overprinted Italiam stamps.  These are generally rare and have been counterfeited.

The base could house up to thirty submarines, and it had dry docks and two basins connected by locks. Shore barracks accommodated a security guard of 250 men of the San Marco Regiment.

A second base was established at La Pallice in La Rochelle, France. This second base allowed submerged training which was not possible at Bordeaux.

Operational detail
From June 1940, three Italian submarines patrolled off the Canary Islands and Madeira, followed by three more off the Azores. When these patrols were completed, the six boats returned to their new base at Bordeaux. Their initial patrol area was the Northwestern Approaches. Dönitz was pragmatic about the Italians, seeing them as inexperienced, but useful for reconnaissance and likely to gain expertise.

In November 1940 there were 26 Italian boats at Bordeaux. Initially, their activity did not meet much success; unacquainted with Atlantic weather conditions,  Italian submarines sighted convoys but lost contact and failed to make effective reports. As co-operation between the two navies was not working well, Dönitz decided to reassign the Italian boats to the southern area where they could act independently. In this way, about thirty Italian boats achieved more success, though without much impact on the most critical areas of the campaign.

Dönitz considered the Italians as displaying "great dash and daring in battle, often exceeding that of Germans", but less toughness, endurance and tenacity. By 30 November 1940, Italian submarines in the Atlantic each sank an average of 200 gross tons per day, while German U-boats each averaged 1,115 gross tons per day during the same period. Italian submarines, however, had only been in the Atlantic for a few months at this time, and had not had yet the time to adapt to the new operational conditions, whereas the U-boats had already been operating there for more than a year.

In an attempt to improve the performance of the Italian submarines, several measures were taken: taking cue from the Kriegsmarine, older Italian submarine commanders (some were 40 years old) were replaced with younger officers, who possessed more aggressiveness and stamina; a "submarine school" was created in Gotenhafen, where commanders, officers and bridge crews of the BETASOM submarines were trained according to the German model (the submarine Reginaldo Giuliani was assigned to this task, in cooperation with German naval units). Italian submarines also underwent improvement work, such as the reshaping of their excessively large conning towers.

These measures significantly improved the performance of the remaining Italian submarines (in 1941, about half were recalled to the Mediterranean following heavy submarine losses in that theatre); the average tonnage sunk by BETASOM submarines rose from 3,844 Gross Register Tons (GRT) in 1940 to 27,335 GRT in 1942 (and, respectively, from 7,779 GRT to 68,337 GRT per actually operating submarine). The tonnage sunk for every lost submarine was 32,672 GRT in 1940 (opposed to 188,423 GRT for German submarines), 20,432 GRT in 1941 (70,871 GRT for Germans submarines), 136,674 GRT in 1942 (68,801 GRT for German submarines) and 13,498 GRT in 1943 (11,391 GRT for German submarines).

Between February and March 1942, five BETASOM submarines (along with six German U-boats) took part in Operation Neuland, sinking 15 of the 45 Allied merchant ships destroyed during this operation.
The top scoring BETASOM aces, Gianfranco Gazzana-Priaroggia (90,601 GRT sunk) and Carlo Fecia di Cossato (96,553 GRT sunk), were among the few Italian recipients of the Knight's Cross of the Iron Cross. Gazzana-Priaroggia's boat, Leonardo da Vinci, was the top-scoring non-German submarine of World War II, with 17 ships sunk totalling 120,243 GRT. Another notable Betasom commander was Salvatore Todaro, known for his habit of towing to safety the lifeboats containing the survivors of ships he had sunk.

Italian naval historian Giorgio Giorgerini writes that Italian submarines did not perform as well as the U-boats, but achieved good results considering the deficiencies of their boats (among which were the lack of modern torpedo fire-control systems, and their slower speed both surfaced and submerged). Comparing the respective tonnages sunk by U-boats compared to the Italian submarines and their respective losses (16 Italian submarines lost against 247 U-boats), the respective "exchange rates" (gross tonnage sunk divided by the number of submarines lost) were respectively 40.591 t for the German units and 34.512 t for the Italian ones. The strategic significance of Italy's participation in the Battle of the Atlantic was however small, as the number of Italian submarines that operated in the Atlantic was 30 at its peak, whereas the Kriegsmarine committed over 1,000 submarines to the battle of the Atlantic between 1939 and 1945.

Overall, Italian submarines operating in the Atlantic sank 109 allied merchant ships totalling 601,425 tons, and lost 16 boats.

German U-boat activities

Admiral Dönitz decided in mid-1941 to build protective U-boat pens in Bordeaux. Construction began in September 1941.

On 15 October 1942, the 12th U-boat Flotilla was formed at Bordeaux by the Kriegsmarine under the command of Korvettenkapitän Klaus Scholtz.

End of operations
The base was bombed by the British on several occasions, especially in 1940 and 1941, but no significant damage was suffered, except for the sinking of the barracks ship Usaramo. The base was indirectly attacked by Operation Josephine B in June 1941, a sabotage raid that destroyed the electricity substation that served the base.

The remaining BETASOM boats ended their last offensive patrol in 1943, after which seven BETASOM submarines were adapted to carry critical matériel from the Far East (Bagnolini, Barbarigo, Comandante Cappellini, Finzi, Giuliani, Tazzoli, and Torelli) as part of an agreement between Italy and Germany; Italy had agreed to convert the surviving Betasom submarines, larger than German U-Boats and thus more suited for transport missions, in exchange for the transfer from the Kriegsmarine to the Regia Marina of an equal number of Type VIIC U-Boats, which would be manned by Italian crews and thus continue the Italian participation in offensive submarine operations in the Atlantic. Of the transport submarines, two were sunk by the Allies, three were captured in the Far East by the Japanese after the Italian surrender in the Armistice of Cassibile of September 1943, and ceded to the Germans, and two were captured in Bordeaux by the Germans. The U-Boats ceded to Italy were still training in Danzig with their new Italian crews when the armistice was announced, and were immediately retaken by the Kriegsmarine. Ammiraglio Cagni, the newest Betasom submarine and the only one still on patrol at the time of the armistice, broke off her patrol and reached Durban in South Africa in compliance with the armistice orders.

After the Armistice of Cassibile the base was seized by the Germans. Some of the Italian personnel joined the Germans independently of the Italian Social Republic. During this period the Italian postage stamps on hand were overprinted to show loyalty to Mussolini's rump state.

The last two remaining U-boats left Bordeaux in August 1944, three days before the Allies occupied the base on 25 August. The last remaining German naval personnel attempted to march back to Germany but were captured by US forces on 11 September 1944.

List of submarines operating from BETASOM
In 1940, all twenty-eight Italian submarines which were to be based at BETASOM initially had to sail from bases on the Mediterranean Sea and transit the Straits of Gibraltar to reach the Atlantic Ocean. All twenty-eight did this successfully without incident.

In 1941, another four Italian submarines based in Italian East Africa (Africa Orientale Italiana, or AOI) reached the base after the fall of that colony during the East African Campaign. All four had to travel around the Cape of Good Hope to get to BETASOM.

Transferred from the Red Sea Flotilla during the summer of 1941:

In 1941, it was decided to return some of the boats to the Mediterranean. Perla, Guglielmotti, Brin, Argo, Velella, Dandolo, Emo, Otaria, Mocenigo, and Veniero made the passage. Glauco also made the return voyage but was sunk by the British Royal Navy off Cape Spartel.

The submarine cruiser  was dispatched from the Mediterranean to patrol off South Africa in October 1942. On completion she returned to Bordeaux, transferring to BETASOM in February 1943. She was converted there for transport to the Far East but was overtaken by the Italian Armistice in September 1943 and was interned at Durban.

Post-World War II
The submarine pens have proved to be infeasible to demolish due to their massive reinforced construction which had been designed to withstand aerial bombardment.

Notes

References

External links
 Official site by the city of Bordeaux 
 History of the Bordeaux submarine base plus construction details
 U-boat history of boats, operations etc.
 Regia Marina
 Base de submarinos, BETASOM 

Italian Navy submarine bases
Regia Marina
Military history of Italy during World War II
Battle of the Atlantic
France–Italy relations
Buildings and structures in Bordeaux
Tourist attractions in Bordeaux